857 Glasenappia is a minor planet orbiting the Sun. It was named after Russian astronomer Sergey Glazenap, who was often referred to as "S. de Glasenapp" in pre-Revolution publications.

References

External links 
 
 

000857
Discoveries by Sergei Belyavsky
Named minor planets
000857
19160406